Christine Hargreaves (22 March 1939 – 12 August 1984) was an English actress who was known for portraying the role of Christine Hardman on the ITV soap opera Coronation Street from 1960 to 1963. After attending the Royal Academy of Dramatic Art, Hargreaves became one of the original cast members of Coronation Street. She also appeared in Pink Floyd—The Wall as Pink's mother, The Spongers (1978), and the BBC's Play For Today series. Hargreaves died in August 1984 from a brain tumour at the age of 45.

Filmography

References

External links

 

1939 births
1984 deaths
20th-century British actresses
Actresses from Salford
Actresses from Lancashire
Deaths from brain cancer in England
English soap opera actresses
English television actresses
Alumni of RADA
20th-century English women
20th-century English people
20th-century British businesspeople